The Transguinean Railways is a proposed set of heavy duty standard gauge railways in Guinea to support heavy duty haulage of primarily iron ore and bauxite.

Maps 
 UNHCR Atlas Map (2004) shows topography.
 UN map shows provinces; towns; railways

Overview 

Existing railways in Guinea are badly maintained and feeble, and would need to be rebuilt from the ground up to support a tenfold or hundredfold increase in tonneages.  The new lines would also avoid undesirable rises and falls though hilly terrain.

Gauge 

The new lines would be standard gauge (1435mm) so as to benefit most from off the shelf equipment, and to achieve the highest secondhand value of surplus equipment.  The existence of successful heavy duty narrow gauge lines in South Africa, Queensland and Brazil would not affect this choice.

North Trans-Guinean Railway
This 135 km long Standard Gauge railway is under construction to connect Santou II and Houda bauxite mines around Boffa with the new Dapilon river port at Yakabya, around 25km west of Boké
The line, due for completion in 2021, is intended to carry predominantly bauxite. Dapilon port has been criticised for the effects of bauxite dust causing environmental damage to fields, cashew plantations and nearby settlements.

See: Boffa-Boke Railway

South Trans-Guinean Railways (Proposed) 
This 650km long railway, mooted to be operational by 2025, would connect the iron ore mines around Simandou (south-eastern Guinea) with a proposed new deepwater port at Matakong on a coastal island between the capital of Conakry and the Sierra Leone border.  Shallow waters require a 20km long pier to reach deep water suitable for Panamax sized ships.  The total cost of this project, including mine, port and railway, etc., is estimated at US$17 billion.  The project is being run by BOKÉ Mining Company (SMB) joint venture which won the tender to exploit blocks 1 and 2 of the Simandou iron-ore deposits in 2019.

Borders 

The planned new line roughly parallels Guinea's southern border with Sierra Leone and Liberia. Regions served will be are Kindia, Mamou, Faranah and Nzérékoré.

See also 
 Transport in Guinea
 Railway stations in Guinea

Reports

References 

Rail transport in Guinea